Kateřina Böhmová and Michaëlla Krajicek were the defending champions, but did not compete in the Juniors that year.

Victoria Azarenka and Ágnes Szávay won the title, defeating Raluca-Ioana Olaru and Amina Rakhim in the final, 4–6, 6–4, 6–0.

Seeds

  Yung-Jan Chan /  Aleksandra Wozniak (semifinals)
  Alexa Glatch /  Olga Govortsova (quarterfinals)
  Victoria Azarenka /  Ágnes Szávay (champions)
  Sharon Fichman /  Caroline Wozniacki (semifinals)
  Mihaela Buzărnescu /  Bibiane Schoofs (quarterfinals)
  Sorana Cîrstea /  Alexandra Dulgheru (first round)
  Mădălina Gojnea /  Monica Niculescu (quarterfinals)
  Raluca Olaru /  Amina Rakhim (final)

Draw

Finals

Top half

Bottom half

Sources
Draw

Girls' Doubles
French Open, 2005 Girls' Doubles